Pianu is a commune located in Alba County, Transylvania, Romania. It has a population of 3,390 and is composed of five villages: Pianu de Jos (Alsópián), Pianu de Sus (the commune center), Plaiuri (Plaintelep), Purcăreți (Sebespurkerec) and Strungari (Sztrugár).

It is traversed from south to north (first through Pianu de Sus and then Pianu de Jos) by the Pianul river.

There are traces in Pianu of settlements dating back to the Roman period, when the 13th Twin Legion had encampments in the area. The commune was first attested in the 12th century; Pianu de Sus was attested in a deed registered in 1454 in Sibiu.

Natives
Ioan Neag

References

Communes in Alba County
Localities in Transylvania